All About Tonight is the second extended play, and eighth studio release by American country music artist Blake Shelton. It was released on August 10, 2010, via Warner Music Group Nashville, under its Reprise label. The first single, "All About Tonight," was released to radio in April 2010 and has become his seventh Number One hit on the U.S. Billboard Hot Country Songs charts. The album's second single, "Who Are You When I'm Not Looking" (previously recorded by Joe Nichols on his 2007 album Real Things), was released to radio in September 2010.

Background
All About Tonight is Shelton's second "Six Pak", a concept that he and his record label decided to experiment with in 2010 starting with Hillbilly Bone. Shelton said, "We're looking for ways to remind people that we still make albums, and there's still cool music that you may or may not hear on the radio. So we decided to do a six-song album, and it's really cheap! It's like five dollars and change".

Shelton returned to releasing full albums after All About Tonight, and in 2012 he reminisced about the six pak concept, saying, "Remember when we were doing the six paks and we thought that was going to be the wave of the future? That was dumb — it wasn’t — but we thought it was going to be a big deal then. But the bottom line is we were still making records that we believed in at that time. No matter if there were six songs or 12 songs, they were all songs that we thought were important."

Content
All About Tonights title track was released as the lead single. Rhett Akins, who wrote the song along with Ben Hayslip and Dallas Davidson, told The Boot, "It's a good, fun party song about where the night is going to go. After we wrote it, we thought it sound[ed] just like a Blake Shelton song. It's his life!" Shelton had previously recorded several songs written by Akins and later remarked, "Every writer will always say, 'Man, I wrote this song for you,'...But with Rhett, maybe he actually did write a song with me in mind, just because I cut so many of his songs...it's a good place to be when there's a certain song that, even if I'm not singing it, somebody goes, 'That sounds like a Blake Shelton song.' That's when you're finally creating that sound that is unique to one specific artist like Travis Tritt and Garth Brooks did."

The EP's second single, "Who Are You When I'm Not Looking", was originally recorded by Joe Nichols on his album Real Things.

"Draggin' the River" was originally intended as a solo for a male artist, but Shelton's then-fiance, Miranda Lambert, suggested recording the song together as a duet. Shelton noted that he and Lambert had rarely recorded together, in part because they wanted to avoid "cheesy love duets", but called their collaboration on this song "meant to be" and said, "if there was ever a song that was a perfect lyric for us and our personalities, it was 'Dragging the River'."

Lambert co-wrote the song "Suffocating" with Hillary Scott of Lady Antebellum. They felt that the song was more suitable for a male artist, and Shelton had them promise that he could be the one to record it. He initially planned to include the song on his preceding EP, Hillybilly Bone. Scott performs harmonies on the track.

Critical reception

Upon its release, All About Tonight received generally positive reviews from most music critics. At Metacritic, which assigns a normalized rating out of 100 to reviews from mainstream critics, the album received an average score of 71, based on 5 reviews, which indicates "generally favorable reviews".

Jon Caramanica with The New York Times said that the release is "a variety-pack of country styles" and said he sounded "flirty and convincing" on the release. Thom Jurek with Allmusic gave it a three star rating, saying "Shelton does two things, and he does them extremely well: rowdy, rocking contemporary tunes about raising hell and making romantic mischief, and singing (mostly) believable ballads". Gary Graff with Billboard gave it a favorable review, saying "the singer's latest set, All About Tonight, is a satisfying sprint without fat or filler but packs plenty of fun." Bill Friskics-Warren with The Washington Post gave it a favorable review, saying "Shelton's latest "six pak" harks back to a time when Nashville rebels could be rowdy and real at the same time".

Matt Popkin with American Songwriter gave it a 2½ star rating, comparing it to a comedy series saying "Blake Shelton’s All About Tonight is what I imagine being in the studio audience for an average sitcom would be like [...] And yes, you’re aware that somebody worked very hard on these jokes, but still, every time you laugh, you feel like a little part of you just died, and it’s located in the left hemisphere of your brain.

Commercial performance
The album debuted at number six on the U.S. Billboard 200, and at number one on the U.S. Billboard Top Country Albums, selling 33,000 copies in its first week of release. The number one debut on the Top Country Albums chart gave Shelton his first number one album of his career. As of the chart dated January 8, 2011, the album has sold 149,385 copies in the US.

Track listing

Personnel

 Rob Beckham – booking
 Steve Blackmon – assistant
 Brandon Blackstock – management
 Narvel Blackstock – management
 Brooke Boling – design
 Drew Bollman – assistant
 Holly Chapman – grooming
 Steve Crowder – assistant
 Steph Dufresne – assistant
 Russ Harrington – photography
 Scott Hendricks – digital editing, engineer, producer
 Steve Marcantonio – tracking
 Cheryl H. McTyre – a&r admin.
 Jacob Murray – assistant
 Tre Nagella – assistant
 Justin Niebank – mixing
 Allen Parker – assistant
 Katherine Petillo – art direction
 Nick Spezia – assistant
 Todd Tidwell – assistant
 Trish Townsend – stylist
 Hank Williams – mastering
 Brian David Willis – digital editing
 Tim Akers – hammond b-3 Organ, Piano
 Mike Brignardello – bass guitar
 Tom Bukovac – electric guitar
 Perry Coleman – background vocals
 Eric Darken – percussion 
 Paul Franklin – pedal steel guitar 
 Aubrey Haynie – fiddle
 Miranda Lambert – duet vocals on "draggin' the river"
 Troy Lancaster – electric guitar
 Brent Mason – electric guitar
 Greg Morrow – drums, percussion
 Gordon Mote – hammond b-3 Organ, Piano
 Tony Mullins – background vocals
 Hillary Scott – background vocals
 Blake Shelton – lead vocals 
 Jimmie Lee Sloas – bass guitar
 Bryan Sutton – banjo, acoustic guitar, mandolin
 Craig Wiseman – jew's harp, background vocals
 Jennifer Zuffinetti – background vocals

Chart positions

Weekly charts

End of year charts

Singles

References

2010 EPs
Blake Shelton EPs
Albums produced by Scott Hendricks
Reprise Records EPs
Warner Records EPs